Chantada is a comarca in the Galician Province of Lugo. The overall population of this local region is ? (2005).

Municipalities
Carballedo, Chantada and Taboada.

References 

Comarcas of the Province of Lugo